115A may refer to:
 Florida State Road 115A
 New Hampshire Route 115A